Susan Osborn is an American author, editor, and a scholar of modern British and Irish literature and rhetoric and composition who teaches in the English department at Rutgers University, New Brunswick, on a part-time basis as a lecturer. She founded and serves as director of the Princeton Writing Center, a privately owned operation, unaffiliated with Princeton University.

Biography
Osborn's novel, Surviving the Wreck, was published in 2001.

In addition to her work at Princeton Writing Center, Osborn teaches fiction writing, business writing, and English at Rutgers University as a part-time lecturer. Earlier in her tenure at Rutgers, she served as research director and development coordinator for the New Jersey Center for Research on Writing. She has published several articles in the field of composition and rhetoric, including "Revision/Re-vision" in Rhetoric Review.

Much of her scholarly work focuses on modern British and Irish culture, history, and literature, though she is renowned as an Elizabeth Bowen scholar.  Her most recent book on Bowen is Elizabeth Bowen: New Critical Perspectives. She served as guest editor for Purdue University's scholarly journal, Modern Fiction Studies, (Summer 2007) issue, which was a Special Issue devoted exclusively to the work of Elizabeth Bowen. She contributed the introduction to that edition and an essay titled  "Reconsidering Elizabeth Bowen."

References

External links
 Princeton Writing Center
 Susan Osborn.net

American literary critics
Women literary critics
Living people
Year of birth missing (living people)
American women non-fiction writers
21st-century American women writers
American women critics